Parker Memorial Baptist Church is a historic Southern Baptist church at 1205 Quintard Avenue in Anniston, Alabama. Built in 1888, it was added to the Alabama Register of Landmarks and Heritage in 1981, and the National Register of Historic Places in 1985.

References

External links
 See also: 

Baptist churches in Alabama
Churches on the National Register of Historic Places in Alabama
National Register of Historic Places in Calhoun County, Alabama
Gothic Revival church buildings in Alabama
Churches completed in 1888
Churches in Calhoun County, Alabama
Southern Baptist Convention churches